Virmuni Rural District is a rural district (dehestan) in the Central District of Astara County, Gilan Province, Iran. At the 2006 census, its population was 14,970, in 3,720 families. The rural district has 22 villages.

References 

Rural Districts of Gilan Province
Astara County